Irina Andreyevna Gordeeva (born 9 October 1986 in St. Petersburg) is a Russian former high jumper.

She finished seventh at the 2003 World Youth Championships, ninth at the 2004 World Junior Championships, fifth at the 2009 European Indoor Championships and fifth at the 2009 World Athletics Final. She competed at the 2010 World Indoor Championships without reaching the final.

Gordeeva won a bronze medal at the 2012 European Athletics Championships in Helsinki on 28 June.

Her personal best is 2.04 metres, achieved in August 2012 in Eberstadt.

Competition record

References

1986 births
Living people
Athletes from Saint Petersburg
Russian female high jumpers
Olympic female high jumpers
Olympic athletes of Russia
Athletes (track and field) at the 2012 Summer Olympics
World Athletics Championships athletes for Russia
Authorised Neutral Athletes at the World Athletics Championships
European Athletics Championships medalists
Competitors at the 2011 Summer Universiade
Russian Athletics Championships winners